Tan Sri Dr. Chen Lip Keong (曾立强) born 22 July 1948, is a Malaysian businessman who is currently the 9th richest person in Malaysia.

Early years 
Chen was born in 1948 in Kuala Lumpur, the capital of Malaysia. Chen is of Chinese ethnicity. Chen grew up in Kinta Valley, Malaysia.

Education 
Chen graduated from University of Malaya.

Career 
Chen's career started as a medical doctor of general practice.

In 1994, Chen was the first to win the casino license from Cambodia.

Chen is the CEO of NagaCorp, parent company of NagaWorld casino resort complex in Phnom Penh. Chen also built Naga2, a twin tower. They are connected by NagaCity Walk, an underground shopping mall.

Personal life 
Chen's wife is Puan Sri Lee Chou Sarn. They have three sons, Chen Yiy Hwuan, Chen Yepern and Chen Yiy Fon.

Honours
  :
 Companion of the Order of the Defender of the Realm (JMN) (1991)
 Commander of the Order of Loyalty to the Crown of Malaysia (PSM) - Tan Sri (1995)
 :
 Knight Companion of the Order of the Crown of Pahang (DIMP) - Dato'
 :
 Knight Companion of the Order of Sultan Salahuddin Abdul Aziz Shah (DSSA) - Dato' (1988)

See also 
 List of Malaysians of Chinese descent#Businesspeople
 NagaCorp

References

External links 
 NagaCorp Ltd Shareholders

1948 births
Living people
University of Malaya alumni
Commanders of the Order of Loyalty to the Crown of Malaysia
Companions of the Order of the Defender of the Realm